Ingeborg ("Inge") Braumüller (later Betz, later Machts, November 23, 1909 – April 6, 1999) was a German track and field athlete who competed in the 1928 Summer Olympics.

She was born in Berlin and died in Hanover. She was the older sister of Ellen Braumüller.

In 1928 she finished seventh in the high jump event.

External links
 

1909 births
1999 deaths
Athletes from Berlin
German female high jumpers
Olympic athletes of Germany
Athletes (track and field) at the 1928 Summer Olympics
Women's World Games medalists